Abu Hamad, also spelt 'Abu Hamed', is a town of Sudan on the right bank of the Nile, 345 miles by rail north of Khartoum.  It stands at the centre of the great S-shaped bend of the Nile, and from it the railway to Wadi Halfa strikes straight across the Nubian Desert, a little west of the old caravan route to Korosko. The population of Abu Hamad is 69,056.A branch railway, 138 mi long, from Abu Hamad goes down the right bank of the Nile to Karima in the Dongola mudiria.

The town is named after a celebrated sheikh buried here, by whose tomb travellers crossing the desert used formerly to deposit all superfluous goods, the sanctity of the saint's tomb ensuring their safety.

The Battle of Abu Hamed, a part of the Anglo-Egyptian reconquest of the Sudan, took place near the town on 7 August 1897.

Climate 
Abu Hamad has a hot desert climate (Köppen climate classification BWh).

References 

Populated places in River Nile (state)